The Favourite of Schonbrunn (German: Der Günstling von Schönbrunn) is a 1929 German historical film directed by Erich Waschneck and Max Reichmann and starring Iván Petrovich, Lil Dagover and Vera Malinovskaya. It was a part-talkie, with some sequences in sound and others silent.

The film's sets were designed by Erich Czerwonski and Alfred Junge.

Cast
 Iván Petrovich as Oberst Trenck
 Lil Dagover as Kaiserin Maria Theresia
 Vera Malinovskaya as Gräfin Nostiz  
 Henry Stuart as Kaiser Franz
 Kurt Vespermann as Trencks Diener 
 John Mylong as Ordonnanz des Kaisers 
 Ferdinand von Alten 
 Valeria Blanka 
 Ludwig Stössel 
 Alexander Murski

See also
 Trenck, der Pandur (1940)

References

Bibliography
 Kosta, Barbara. Willing Seduction: The Blue Angel, Marlene Dietrich, and Mass Culture. Berghahn Books, 2009.

External links

1929 films
Films of the Weimar Republic
Films directed by Erich Waschneck
German silent feature films
Transitional sound films
1920s German-language films
Films set in Austria
Films set in the 18th century
German historical films
1920s historical films
Bavaria Film films
German black-and-white films
1920s German films